Dendrophylax porrectus, the jingle bell orchid, or needleroot orchid, is a species of epiphytic orchid native to Mexico, El Salvador, Guatemala, Florida, Cayman Islands, Cuba, Hispaniola, Jamaica, and Puerto Rico.

Dendrophylax porrectus has been referred to by many authors by the synonym Harrisella porrecta, including in the Flora of North America.

References

External links
Florida Native Orchids, Jingle Bell Orchid, Needleroot Orchid (Dendrophylax porrectus (syn. Harrisella porrecta))
Leighton Photography, Jingle Bell Orchid (Dendrophylax porrectus) 
Dave's Garden, Needleroot Airplant, Threadroot Orchid, Leafless, Extended Dendrophylax (Dendrophylax porrectus)  

porrectus
Epiphytic orchids
Plants described in 1865
Orchids of Puerto Rico
Orchids of Mexico
Orchids of Florida
Orchids of Central America
Flora of the Caribbean
Flora without expected TNC conservation status